The Lizonne, also called the Nizonne, is a  long river in the Dordogne and Charente departments in southwestern France. Its source is near Morelière, a hamlet in Sceau-Saint-Angel. It flows generally southwest. It is a right tributary of the Dronne, into which it flows between Saint-Séverin and Allemans.

Part of its course forms part of the border between the Dordogne and Charente departments.

Departments and communes along its course
This list is ordered from source to mouth: 
 Dordogne: Sceau-Saint-Angel, Saint-Front-sur-Nizonne, Champeaux-et-la-Chapelle-Pommier, Rudeau-Ladosse, Saint-Sulpice-de-Mareuil, Puyrenier, Beaussac, Les Graulges, Sainte-Croix-de-Mareuil, Combiers, La Rochebeaucourt-et-Argentine, 
 Charente: Édon, 
 Dordogne: Champagne-et-Fontaine, 
 Charente: Blanzaguet-Saint-Cybard, Gurat, 
 Dordogne: Vendoire, 
 Charente: Vaux-Lavalette, Salles-Lavalette, 
 Dordogne: Nanteuil-Auriac-de-Bourzac, 
 Charente: Palluaud, 
 Dordogne: Bouteilles-Saint-Sébastien, Saint-Paul-Lizonne, 
 Charente: Saint-Séverin, 
 Dordogne: Allemans,

References

Rivers of France
Rivers of Charente
Rivers of Dordogne
Rivers of Nouvelle-Aquitaine